Boldsaikhany Khongorzul (born 27 May 2001) is a Mongolian freestyle wrestler. In 2019, she won the gold medal in the 57kg event at the 2019 Asian U23 Wrestling Championship held in Ulaanbaatar, Mongolia.  She also qualified to represent Mongolia at the 2020 Summer Olympics in Tokyo, Japan.

References

External links 
 
 
 

2001 births
Living people
Place of birth missing (living people)
Mongolian female sport wrestlers
Olympic wrestlers of Mongolia
Wrestlers at the 2020 Summer Olympics
Asian Wrestling Championships medalists
21st-century Mongolian women